The Aryavart Bank (AB) is an Indian Regional Rural Bank (RRB) in Uttar Pradesh established on 1 April 2019. The bank was formed by the amalgamation of Gramin Bank of Aryavart and Allahabad UP Gramin Bank. It currently has 1365 branches and 22 regional offices in rural areas of Uttar Pradesh, around Lucknow. It functions under Regional Rural Banks' Act 1976 and is sponsored by Bank of India.Allahabad UP Gramin Bank and Gramin Bank of Aryavart are mergering with name Aryavart Bank e.r.f 01.04.2019. It is under the ownership of Ministry of Finance , Government of India.

Bank structure
The Head Office is located at Lucknow. There are over twenty regional offices. The Aryavart Bank is operating in 26 districts namely Agra, Aligarh, Ayodhya, Bahraich, Banda, Barabanki, Chitrakoot, Etah, Farrukhabad, Firozabad, Hamirpur, Hardoi, Hathras, Jalaun, Kannauj, Kasganj, Lakhimpur, Lucknow, Mahoba, Mainpuri, Mathura, Mirzapur, Shravasti, Sitapur, Sonbhadra and Unnao in the State of Uttar Pradesh with a network of 1365 branches & 23 regional offices.

Area of operations
The Aryavart Bank has the unique distinction of having had as many different RRBs earlier functioning in different parts of Uttar Pradesh, merged with it at various points of time. The bank operates in over 25 districts.

Schemes
Following are schemes being run by the bank:
 Rural Housing Finance Scheme
 Solar Home Lighting System
 General Credit Cards
 Vermi Compost Hatchery Unit Scheme
 Farm Mechanisation
 Financial Assistance To Farmers For Purchase of Two Wheelers
 Financial Assistance To Farmers For Purchase of Land For Agriculture Purpose
 Education Loan
 Scheme For Solar Water Heater System
 Kisan Credit Card
 Advance Against Insurance Policies
 Financial Assistance For Mediclinics For Qualified Medical Practitioners
 Housing Loan
 Scheme of Agriculture Graduates For Establishing Agri Clinics And Agri Business
 Amra Krishak Card
 Capital Investment Subsidy Scheme of Rural Godowns / Cold Storage
 Financial Assistance Against Storage Receipt
 Kisan Credit Card For Tenant Farmers / Oral Lessees / Joint Liability Groups (Jlgs)
 Small Road Transport Operator Scheme
 Swarojgar Credit Card Scheme
 Annapurna Scheme – A Consumer Loan Scheme For Salaried A/C Holders
 Acharyhit Yojna – Scheme For Retired Teachers
 Mahila Udyami Credit Card
 Grah Laxmi Yojna For Women
 Kisan Samadhan Card

Awards
On 19 June 2008 Aryavart Gramin Bank received Ashden Award 2008. This award was for an innovative scheme to make available finance for Solar Home Lighting Systems (SHS) with a slogan "Ghar Ghar Me Ujala" (Light in every house) mainly to provide ambient light at home to improve living standard, education, health and welfare of the people residing in rural, semi urban and even in urban areas beset with frequent power cuts.

Subsidiaries

Aryavart Kshetriya Gramin Bank 
This bank was constituted on 1 October 2012 after amalgamation of two RRBs  Aryavart Gramin Bank and Kshetriya Kisan Gramin Bank.

Aryavart Gramin Bank was sponsored by Bank of India while Kshetriya Kisan Gramin Bank was sponsored by UP Cooperative Bank Limited Lucknow.

Aryavart Gramin Bank 
This Bank was constituted on 3rd October 2006 after amalgamation of three Regional Rural Banks (RRBs) namely Avadh Gramin Bank, Barabanki Gramin Bank and Farrukhabad Gramin Bank.

See also 
 List of banks in India
 List of regional rural banks in Uttar Pradesh

References

Regional rural banks of Uttar Pradesh
2019 establishments in Uttar Pradesh
Indian companies established in 2019
Banks established in 2019
Companies based in Lucknow